Rosângela Rocha (born 19 November 1962), commonly known as Danda, is a Brazilian former footballer who played as a midfielder for the Brazil women's national football team. She was part of the team at the 1991 FIFA Women's World Cup. At the club level, she played for EC Radar in Brazil.

References

External links
 
 

1962 births
Living people
Brazilian women's footballers
Brazil women's international footballers
Place of birth missing (living people)
1991 FIFA Women's World Cup players
Women's association football midfielders